Crematogaster arizonensis is a species of ant in tribe Crematogastrini. It was described by Wheeler in 1908.

References

arizonensis
Insects described in 1908